The following is a list of the 266 communes of the Vienne department of France.

The communes cooperate in the following intercommunalities (as of 2020):
Communauté urbaine Grand Poitiers
Communauté d'agglomération Grand Châtellerault
Communauté de communes du Civraisien en Poitou
Communauté de communes du Haut-Poitou
Communauté de communes du Pays Loudunais
Communauté de communes des Vallées du Clain
Communauté de communes Vienne et Gartempe

References

Vienne